Anatoliy Volodymyrovych Chystov (born 27 May 1962) is a former Ukrainian football player.

Honours
Tiligul Tiraspol
 Soviet First League runner-up: 1991

Dnipro
 Ukrainian Premier League runner-up: 1992–93

References

1962 births
Sportspeople from Simferopol
Living people
Soviet footballers
Ukrainian footballers
FC Chornomorets Odesa players
FC Zimbru Chișinău players
FC Bukovyna Chernivtsi players
Ukrainian Premier League players
CS Tiligul-Tiras Tiraspol players
FC Nyva Ternopil players
FC Kryvbas Kryvyi Rih players
FC Dnipro players
FC SKA-Lotto Odesa players
SC Odesa players
FC Chornomorets-2 Odesa players
Ukrainian expatriate footballers
Expatriate footballers in Sweden

Association football goalkeepers